Notable earthquakes in the history of Panama include the following:

Earthquakes

References

Earthquakes in Panama
Panama
Earthquakes
Earthquakes